Eko Pradana Putra is a Singaporean footballer who plays for Home United FC as a goalkeeper.

He started playing in the Sleague for Geylang International in 2012 before moving to the Home United prime league team in 2014 and was promoted to the Sleague squad in 2016.

Club career

Geylang International

He began his professional football career with Geylang International in the Sleague in 2011 for their prime league squad.

Home United
He joined the Home United academy to play in their prime league squad.  He was later promoted to the main squad in 2015 aby Philipe Aw

Career statistics

References

Year of birth missing (living people)
Living people
Singaporean footballers
Association football goalkeepers
Home United FC players